The Masked Singer Vietnam ("mask singer") is a reality TV show about music broadcast on HTV2 - Vie Channel, Vie Entertainment and VieON from 16 July 2022. This is the Vietnamese version of the South Korean television show King of Mask Singer.

Format 
Each season of The Masked Singer Vietnam includes contestants who are talented singers. The 15 contestants participating in the program will be divided into 3 groups. They will dress up in mascots provided by the show and their true identities are kept hidden throughout their participation. As each character appears, the show will provide an introductory video hint with clues that have a close relationship with that character. The character will then perform a song remixed and performed with his or her real voice. Advisors have the right to ask the character questions to understand more information about the character, and are also provided with other clues about the character so that the advisory board can predict who the character is. During the process of participating in the program until the mask is taken off, except to show their voice, the character will speak in a voice different from the real voice.

In the first three episodes, after the mysterious character's performance is over, each member of the panelists records their "first impression" of the character by writing what they think is their real name. of the character and sent back to the program. The content they record on the paper is kept secret until the character takes off the mask and reveals his true identity (note that more than 1 name can be written on the sheet, but only the first name entered will be taken into account in the results, the following names, if correct, will not be recognized).

At the end of the performance of all the characters in the same episode, the panelists and 99 audiences in the studio at the time of filming will vote for their favorite character. The total number of votes of the advisory board and the audience for each character is converted to the percentage of votes for each character. The character with the lowest number of votes will have to take off the mask and reveal his/her true identity.

 In the first three episodes, no one was eliminated, so the results are added to the next three episodes (in the same group) to get the final result. 
 From episode 7-9, there is only 1 vote, the character with the lowest vote rate will have to be revealed. 
 From episodes 10-12, the characters will be shuffled into 3 battle groups, each group consists of 3 characters from 3 tables. Only 1 character with the highest number of votes is safe, the remaining 2 characters must perform play-off and the advisory board will decide who goes next. 
 From episodes 13-15, the remaining characters will perform weekly (especially for the semi-final night, there will be additional mascots), after each episode, 1 character will be revealed until only Top 3 are left.
 At the final (episode 16), 3 characters will perform a completely new song by the show and perform together in the final performance (also completely new song), and then the audience will vote for the winner. The last 3 characters will show up and take off their masks in the order of Top 3 - Runner-up - Champion. Particularly in season 1, due to a change in the number of contestants (the Top 4 were kept until the Final round due to the equal voting rate in the Semi-finals), only the character with the lowest voting rate had to appear. The remaining 3 characters continued to vote online via SMS and VieON application. The final results will be announced at the awards ceremony night.
 The character with the highest number of votes in the Top 3 will win the Champion title, owning the "Golden Mask" trophy and a prize money of 400 million VND (300 million VND from the producer Vie Channel + 100 million VND from the show producers), which was sponsor by VIB, awarded via VIB Travel Elite card). Runner-up and Top 3 will receive prizes of VND 200 million and VND 100 million respectively from the producer Vie Channel along with the program's medal.

In addition to the character competition, there was also have the "Golden Ears" trophy for the best panelist of that season. After each character is revealed, the prediction of each panelist will be announced. If the guest panelist who participated in the pitching episode did not participate in the episode where the character was revealed, only the results of the three main panelists will be announced. Each correct guess of the character will give the panelist 1 point. After all 15 characters are revealed (from episodes 4-14 and the Finals, each episode reveals 1 character, the awards ceremony will reveal all 3 final characters), the panelist has a most high score will receive the "Golden Ears" trophy of the show.

List of seasons

Awards and nominations

References

External links 

 

Vietnamese television programmes
Reality television
Vietnamese-language television shows
Ho Chi Minh City Television original programming